John Carlo Barreras Tiuseco (born April 16, 1985), professionally known as JC Tiuseco, is a Filipino actor, basketball player, TV host and model.
He achieved fame after participating in and winning the first season of Survivor Philippines.

Personal life
Tiuseco was born in Manila, son of James Tiuseco, a businessman and his wife Rosemarie Barreras a registered nurse and businesswoman. He has 2 siblings, Vivian Tiuseco (who manages the family business and own business) and Karl Anthony Tiuseco (has own business).

Early life
Tiuseco spent his grade school days in Chiang Kai Shek College and studied in San Sebastian College-Recoletos, Manila during high school.

He was passionate about basketball since his childhood and dreamed of becoming a professional player. He played with jersey #12 as a member of the San Sebastian College basketball team, which competes in NCAA Philippines.
 He graduated with a bachelor's degree in Management.

Modelling career
Tiuseco also works as a model. His most notable job was the Bench Denim and Underwear Fashion Show. He also placed second to his basketball teammate Ram Sagad (Pinoy Fear Factor contestant) in the 2007 Century Tuna Superbods Beachfest, and has appeared in one of Century Tuna's television advertisements.

In 2007, he landed a spot as one of Cosmopolitan Magazine's 69 Hot Bachelors.

Survivor Philippines
Tiuseco won the first season of Survivor Philippines in 2008. He defeated Robert Vincent "Rob" Sy, 7-2, with the seventh vote resulting from him winning a popularity vote. Tiuseco's win was already leaked months earlier, however, when a showbiz-oriented website published the alleged results of the Final Tribal Council in October 2008 after two of the show's staff were overheard in a coffee shop about the show's outcome. Paolo Bediones, the host of the show, labeled that website's report as a spoiler when that article first appeared.

Post-Survivor Philippines
Tiuseco said that Survivor Philippines helped him a lot in his life. He learned how to be contented of what he has right now. He also gained confidence to face problems that will come in his life.

Because of his good looks, many people were speculating that Tiuseco will enter the world of show business. He said that if there's an opportunity given to him, he'll probably enter show business. He is currently taking up a dance workshop and voice lessons in University of the Philippines.

He is currently hosting in the GMA Network weekday morning show, Unang Hirit. He is also the endorser of Elements, the new perfume of Penshoppe as well as the clothing apparel. As an actor, Tiuseco played minor roles in GMA shows until he was given a major role of Troy (originally played by Tonton Gutierrez) in Sine Novela: Kung Aagawin Mo Ang Lahat Sa Akin, alongside Maxene Magalona, Patrick Garcia and Glaiza de Castro.

Filmography

Television

Movies

Awards
 2009 PMPC Star Awards for TV "Best Male-New TV Personality" for "Unang Hirit" (Nominated)

References

External links
JC Tiuseco profile on Survivor Philippines
JC Tiuseco profile on iGMA.tv
JC Tiuseco news, video and photos

1985 births
Living people
Reality show winners
San Sebastian Stags basketball players
Filipino men's basketball players
Basketball players from Manila
Filipino male models
Participants in Philippine reality television series
Survivor (franchise) winners
Survivor Philippines contestants
Winners in the Survivor franchise
GMA Network personalities